Thyretes caffra is a moth in the  family Erebidae. It was described by Wallengren in 1863. It is found in Botswana, Lesotho, Mozambique, Namibia, Sierra Leone, South Africa, Gambia, Zambia and Zimbabwe.

The larvae feed on Acacia karroo.

References

Natural History Museum Lepidoptera generic names catalog

Moths described in 1863
Syntomini
Moths of Sub-Saharan Africa